General Alvear Department is a  department of Corrientes Province in Argentina.

Settlements
Alvear
Estación Torrent

Departments of Corrientes Province